The 1977 Canoe Sprint World Championships were held in Sofia, Bulgaria.

The men's competition consisted of six Canadian (single paddle, open boat) and nine kayak events. Three events were held for the women, all in kayak. The men's K-1 4 x 500 m relay was discontinued at these championships and replaced by the men's K-4 500 m event.

This was the thirteenth championships in canoe sprint.

Medal summary

Men's

Canoe

Kayak

Women's

Kayak

Medals table

References
ICF medalists for Olympic and World Championships - Part 1: flatwater (now sprint): 1936-2007.
ICF medalists for Olympic and World Championships - Part 2: rest of flatwater (now sprint) and remaining canoeing disciplines: 1936-2007.

Icf Canoe Sprint World Championships, 1977
Icf Canoe Sprint World Championships, 1977
ICF Canoe Sprint World Championships
C
Canoeing in Bulgaria